Abaya is a surname. Notable people with the surname include:

César Abaya (born 1984), Chadian professional football player
Craig Abaya (born 1979), American recording artist, filmmaker, photographer, and university program director (Uh-béy-uh)
Francis Gerald Abaya (born 1975), Filipino politician
Jun Abaya (born 1966), Filipino politician
Marc Abaya (born 1979), Filipino musician and television host

See also
Marilou Diaz-Abaya (1955–2012), Filipino film director